8-hydroxyfuranocoumarin 8-O-methyltransferase (furanocoumarin 8-methyltransferase, furanocoumarin 8-O-methyl-transferase, xanthotoxol 8-O-methyltransferase, XMT, SAM:xanthotoxol O-methyltransferase, S-adenosyl-L-methionine:8-hydroxyfuranocoumarin 8-O-methyltransferase, xanthotoxol methyltransferase, xanthotoxol O-methyltransferase, S-adenosyl-L-methionine:xanthotoxol O-methyltransferase, S-adenosyl-L-methionine-xanthotoxol O-methyltransferase) is an enzyme with systematic name S-adenosyl-L-methionine:8-hydroxyfurocoumarin 8-O-methyltransferase. This enzyme catalyses the following chemical reaction

 (1) S-adenosyl-L-methionine + an 8-hydroxyfurocoumarin  S-adenosyl-L-homocysteine + an 8-methoxyfurocoumarin (general reaction)
 (2) S-adenosyl-L-methionine + xanthotoxol  S-adenosyl-L-homocysteine + xanthotoxin

8-hydroxyfuranocoumarin 8-O-methyltransferase converts xanthotoxol into xanthotoxin.

References

External links 
 

EC 2.1.1
Coumarins metabolism